Leonard Francis may refer to:  

 Leonard Glenn Francis, aka Fat Leonard
 Leonard Francis Lindoy, an Australian chemist
 Leonard Francis Tyrwhitt, a Canon of Windsor, 1910-1921